

78001–78100 

|-id=071
| 78071 Vicent ||  || Francesc Vicent (1450–1512), Spanish author of Libre dels jochs partits dels schacs en nombre de 100 which established the modern rules of Chess in Spain || 
|}

78101–78200 

|-id=115
| 78115 Skiantonucci ||  || Robert "Ski" Antonucci (born 1954), an astrophysicist at the University of California Santa Barbara, working on extragalactic astrophysics. || 
|-id=118
| 78118 Bharat || 2002 NT || Bhārat Gaṇarājya is the native name of the Republic of India, derived from the wise and pious King Bharata of ancient Hindu mythology. India is the discoverer's motherland. || 
|-id=123
| 78123 Dimare ||  || Linda Dimare (born 1981), a researcher in celestial mechanics, mainly involved in the development of new algorithms and software for solar system dynamics. || 
|-id=124
| 78124 Cicalò ||  || Stefano Cicalò (born 1982) is a researcher in celestial mechanics, mainly involved in the development of new advanced algorithms and software for the complex dynamics of the radio science experiment of the ESA Bepi Colombo Mission to Mercury and the NASA JUNO mission to Jupiter. || 
|-id=125
| 78125 Salimbeni ||  || Sara Salimbeni (born 1977), an Italian astronomer who has obtained her degree in physics at "La Sapienza" University of Rome in 2003, with a thesis on the cosmological evolution of the deep field galaxy luminosity function. As a Ph.D. student at the University of Rome at Tor Vergata, she is continuing her studies of galaxies and structures evolution. || 
|}

78201–78300 

|-id=221
| 78221 Leonmow ||  || Leon Mow (1919–2002) was an Australian philanthropist with a great interest in astronomy. In 1990 he donated the Leon Mow Dark Sky Site (an observation site) to the Astronomical Society of Victoria (ASV), so that others could share in his passion. The ASV holds a number of public star parties there each year. || 
|-id=249
| 78249 Capaccioni ||  || Fabrizio Capaccioni (born 1957), an Italian astronomer who has studied the electromagnetic effects associated with impact craterization. He currently works on planetary research, with an emphasis on the study of the surface composition of solar-system bodies by means of reflectance spectroscopy techniques. || 
|-id=252
| 78252 Priscio ||  || Priscilla Cerroni (born 1955), an Italian astronomer who works on experiments involving hypervelocity impacts and implications for the study of catastrophic collisions involving minor planets. She is currently a researcher at the Italian INAF-IASF and a team member of VIMS, the imaging spectrometer on board the Cassini mission. || 
|}

78301–78400 

|-id=309
| 78309 Alessielisa ||  || Elisa Maria Alessi (born 1981) has worked for several years in the fields of space debris dynamics, orbit determination for interplanetary missions, and trajectory design in planet-satellite systems. || 
|-id=310
| 78310 Spoto ||  || Federica Spoto (born 1985) has worked in the field of Solar System dynamics. In particular, she is involved in the Impact Monitoring computation and research at NEODyS and AstDyS. || 
|-id=383
| 78383 Philmassey ||  || Philip Massey (born 1952), an astronomer at Lowell Observatory. || 
|-id=386
| 78386 Deuzelur ||  || German Aerospace Center (also known as "DLR"), is Germany's national center for aerospace, energy and transportation research. It was formed in 1969. || 
|-id=391
| 78391 Michaeljäger ||  || Michael Jäger (born 1958), Austrian amateur astronomer and prolific astrophotographer of comets (Src) || 
|-id=392
| 78392 Dellinger ||  || Joseph A. Dellinger (born 1961), American geophysicist and amateur astronomer with the Fort Bend Astronomy Club (FBAC) in Texas. He is a prolific discoverer of minor planets. || 
|-id=393
| 78393 Dillon ||  || William G. Dillon (born 1957), American geophysicist and amateur astronomer with the Fort Bend Astronomy Club (FBAC) in Texas. He is a prolific discoverer of minor planets. || 
|-id=394
| 78394 Garossino ||  || Paul Garossino (born 1953), Canadian geophysicist amateur astronomer and a discoverer of minor planets || 
|}

78401–78500 

|-id=429
| 78429 Baschek ||  || Bodo Baschek (born 1935), is a German astrophysicist is professor emeritus of the Institute for Theoretical Astrophysics at the Ruprecht Karls University of Heidelberg. He contributed to the field of radiation transport with the continuation of Albrecht Unsöld's work. His book The New Cosmos is standard literature for astronomy students. || 
|-id=430
| 78430 Andrewpearce ||  || Andrew Pearce (born 1966), Australian amateur astronomer, significant contributor to the International Comet Quarterly || 
|-id=431
| 78431 Kemble ||  || Lucian J. Kemble (1922–1999), Canadian Franciscan Father and amateur astronomer, discoverer of Kemble's Cascade || 
|-id=432
| 78432 Helensailer ||  || Helen R. Sailer (1918–2019), member of the international women's flying organization, The Ninety-Nines, and great-aunt of the discoverer Robert D. Matson (Src, Src) || 
|-id=433
| 78433 Gertrudolf ||  || Gertrud and Rudolf Hönig, grandparents of German astronomer Sebastian F. Hönig who discovered this minor planet || 
|-id=434
| 78434 Dyer ||  || Alan Dyer (born 1953), Canadian astronomy writer and astrophotographer || 
|-id=453
| 78453 Bullock ||  || Sandra Bullock (born 1964), an American actress and producer || 
|}

78501–78600 

|-id=534
| 78534 Renmir ||  || Renato Bernardi (born 1946) and Mirella Ceccato (born 1946), the parents of co-discoverer Fabrizio Bernardi || 
|-id=535
| 78535 Carloconti ||  || Carlo Conti (born 1961), a popular Italian showman. || 
|-id=536
| 78536 Shrbený ||  || Lukáš Shrbený (born 1981), an astronomer at the Astronomical Institute of the Academy of Sciences of the Czech Republic. || 
|-id=577
| 78577 JPL ||  || The NASA's Jet Propulsion Laboratory is managed by the California Institute of Technology. JPL is the hub of U.S. unmanned spacecraft solar system exploration, with visits to the sun, eight planets and their satellites, four minor planets and two comets. It has also established a permanent presence around Mars. || 
|-id=578
| 78578 Donpettit ||  || Donald Pettit (born 1955), American astronaut who flew on STS-113 to the International Space Station, where he spent over 5{frac|1|2} months as science officer on Expedition 6. An avid amateur astronomer, Pettit recorded dozens of astrophotographs from ISS, most notably numerous 30-second and 60-second exposures of 4 Vesta. || 
|}

78601–78700 

|-id=652
| 78652 Quero ||  || The town of Quero in northern Italy || 
|-id=661
| 78661 Castelfranco ||  || The town of Castelfranco Veneto in northern Italy || 
|}

78701–78800 

|-id=756
| 78756 Sloan ||  || The Sloan Digital Sky Survey, an astronomical survey conducted in New Mexico, that uses a dedicated 2.5-meter telescope to image more than a quarter of the celestial sphere. It has catalogued over 300 million objects and obtained spectra of over a million galaxies, quasars and stars. || 
|}

78801–78900 

|-id=816
| 78816 Caripito ||  || The city of Caripito, Venezuela, where the parents of the discoverer Joseph A. Dellinger met || 
|-id=830
| 78830 Simonadirubbo ||  || Simona Di Rubbo (born 1987) has been interested in astronomy since her childhood. She graduated in Aerospace Engineering in 2013 from the Polytechnic of Turin, Italy. In 2015 she joined the amateur astronomy association in the town of Benevento. Name proposed by A. Boattini and M. Tombelli. || 
|-id=867
| 78867 Isakowitz ||  || Matthew Isakowitz (1987–2017), an American aerospace engineer and contributor to the field of commercial spaceflight, known for the Commercial Spaceflight Federation, XPRIZE, and several newspace companies (obituary). || 
|}

78901–79000 

|-id=905
| 78905 Seanokeefe ||  || Sean O'Keefe (born 1956), former Administrator of NASA 2001–2004 || 
|}

References 

078001-079000